Squaw Valley may refer to:

Communities
 Yokuts Valley, California, formerly known as Squaw Valley, a census-designated place in Fresno County
 Olympic Valley, California, formerly known as Squaw Valley, an unincorporated community in Placer County

Landmarks
 Palisades Tahoe, formerly known as Squaw Valley Ski Resort, in Placer County, California
 Lake Tahoe Preparatory School, formerly known as Squaw Valley Academy, in Placer County, California
 Cedar Valley (Oregon), formerly known as Squaw Valley, in Oregon
 Granite Mountain Reservoir, formerly known as Squaw Valley Reservoir, in Nevada

Other
 the 1960 Winter Olympics, also called the 1960 Squaw Valley Olympics, that took place in Placer County, California

See also

 Squaw Canyon Oil Field, Utah, USA
 Valley (disambiguation)
 Squaw (disambiguation)